Abu Dharr Ali, also known by the regnal name of Nur al-Din Muhammad, was the 35th imam of the Qasim-Shahi branch of the Nizari Isma'ili community.

He succeeded his father, al-Mustansir Billah III, upon his death in 1498, at Anjudan. He apparently married a sister or daughter of the Safavid shah of Persia, Tahmasp I. Despite this close connection to the rulers of Persia however, the Safavids began to persecute all other varieties of Shi'ism that rivalled their own Twelver creed, and Tahmasp launched a persecution of the Nizaris during the reign of Abu Dharr Ali's son and successor, Murad Mirza.

References

Sources

 

15th-century births
16th-century deaths
Nizari imams
15th-century Iranian people
16th-century Iranian people
Iranian Ismailis
15th-century Ismailis
16th-century Ismailis
15th-century Islamic religious leaders
16th-century Islamic religious leaders
People from Markazi Province
16th-century people of Safavid Iran